Schisandrins (schizandrins) are a group of bioactive chemical compounds found in Schisandra chinensis.

Examples include:
 Schisandrin A
 Schisandrin B (γ-schisandrin)
 Schisandrin C

References

Austrobaileyales